Neranjala Pushpa Kumari Balasooriya known as  Kumari Balasuriya is the former Governor of the Southern Province of Sri Lanka since October 2006. She was the first female governor of a Sri Lankan Province.She resigned from the post after fall of the Mahinda Rajapakse's government in 2015.

References

Living people
Year of birth missing (living people)
Governors of Southern Province, Sri Lanka
Sinhalese politicians
Sri Lankan Buddhists
Alumni of Musaeus College
Sinhalese civil servants